Rantepao is a town and capital of North Toraja Regency, which is known for the cultural center of Toraja ethnic group. National and regional tourism offices have developed the city as the starting point for visiting Tana Toraja, since the area was opened for tourism in the 1970s.

Geography
Rantepao has 43,123 inhabitants (census 2010). The town is on river Sadang, about 300 km north-east from Makassar.

Climate
Rantepao has an elevation moderated tropical rainforest climate (Af) with heavy to very heavy rainfall year-round.

Traffic connections
Pongtiku Airfield is about 30 km from Rantepao to the south-west. Three times a week it is served by planes to and from Makassar. At present (2015) it is being enlarged to improve traffic connections and to promote tourism in Tana Toraja. Direct flights to Singapore are planned for the near future.

Sights and culture
Rantepao is the cultural centre of the Toraja who are mainly Christians. Several administration buildings in town were built in the typical style of the Toraja. A sightworthy monument dedicated to the introduction of the Bible in Tana Toraja in 1913 was erected in front of the largest Protestant church. The interior of Santa Theresia Catholic Church, another noteworthy building in town, was designed using traditional elements of the Toraja culture. The Cultural Centre and various administration buildings in the town centre were built in the traditional Toraja style of a tongkonan (a traditional house) with a typical roof.

A monument with a height of 10 metres dedicated to Pong Tiku was erected close to the market in the centre of Rantepao. Pong Tiku was a rebel fighting against the Dutch at the beginning of the 20th century. He was condemned to death in Rantepao in 1907.

Mount Gunung Singki is a mountain in the west of the town centre with a height of 930 metres offering a panoramic view of Rantepao and its surroundings. A tall Christian cross was erected on the top of the mountain.

Surroundings
Rantepao is surrounded by many traditional villages where the Toraja culture is well-preserved.

Ke'te Kesu is a famous village in the south of Rantepoao where a cave with several graves, five large  tongkonans and a dozen of store houses (alang) can be seen.

The village Kambira is known for an old tree in which small children were buried about 100 years ago.

References

External links 

North Toraja Regency
Populated places in South Sulawesi
Regency seats of South Sulawesi